Vatti may refer to:
 Vatti, Chinese kitchen appliances manufacturer
 Vätti, a district of the city of Turku, in Finland.
 Vatti clipping algorithm, a computer graphics algorithm used in clipping arbitrary polygons